Remodeling Her Husband is a 1920 American silent comedy film that marked the only time Lillian Gish directed a film.

D. W. Griffith is stated in some sources as co-director or perhaps had limited input as the production was filmed at his Mamaroneck, New York production facilities. Lillian Gish wrote the story and scenario incognito as Dorothy Elizabeth Carter with Algonquin Round Table writer Dorothy Parker supplying the intertitles. Thus the movie was nearly an all-woman produced movie with the exception of the cameraman.

The film, currently classified as lost, stars Lillian's sister Dorothy Gish and Dorothy's husband at the time James Rennie. George W. Hill, who is the cinematographer, later directed classic films at MGM like Tell It to the Marines (1926) and The Big House (1930).

Plot
As described in film publications, Janie (Gish) gets married with the goal of reforming her husband Jack (Rennie), but he still has the eyes for other women. He promises to reform, but says he is ashamed because she lacks the style of a flapper. All goes well until he meets a pretty woman with a heavy suitcase. He helps her into a taxi cab and takes her home. Janie sees him as she rides by on a bus. That affair gets him into wrong, but he manages to square it with his wife. Then a good looking manicure girl comes into his life, and again Jack falls. Once again Janie is on the job at the psychological moment. This time she leaves him in haste and goes home to her mother. Janie tries to forget Jack by taking a job in her father's office. Jack, who loves her sincerely, is filled with remorse and despair. He calls upon her to beg her forgiveness and, since she still loves him, she yields. But when he attempts to lay down the law to her, she presses a button on her desk and he finds himself being escorted from the office. He threatens suicide, and this is too much for Janie. She comes back to him and they live together happily.

Cast
Dorothy Gish as Janie Wakefield
James Rennie as Jack Valentine
Marie Burke as Mrs. Wakefield
Downing Clarke as Mr. Wakefied
Frank Kingdon as Mr. Valentine
Leslie Marsh as Flower Girl
Mildred Marsh as Bridesmaid
Barden Daube as Flirting Woman

Review
Variety published the following review of the film on December 31, 1919: 
This feature will be liked by film fans but not particularly because of the story or the picturization of it, but through the exquisite comedy Dorothy Gish offers.
The picture seems to be a real Gish family affair, with Dorothy starring and Lillian directing. Much is made of the latter in a title leader, which sets forth that this day is one where woman is asserting herself in all the arts, and therefore it is time she undertook the direction of pictures.
But Lillian does not qualify as a particularly strong directress in this production. The story may have had something to do with that. It is not a world beater but with the action that Dorothy supplies it gets by with laughs.
James Rennie, who plays opposite the star, is the only member of the supporting cast who seems to have more than a ‘bit’ to do. The others while acceptable fail to show often enough to get a line on them. It is a picture that is Dorothy Gish, hook, line and sinker, and it would sink if it weren’t for her.

Preservation status
Remodeling Her Husband is now considered to be a lost film.

See also
List of lost films

References

External links

Contemporary article pt.1, ..contemporary article pt.2, ..contemporary pt.3
Lantern slide
Two shots of Lillian Gish with directors megaphone: #one,..#two

1920 films
1920 comedy films
1920 directorial debut films
Silent American comedy films
American silent feature films
Lost American films
Films directed by Lillian Gish
American black-and-white films
1920 lost films
Lost comedy films
1920s American films